Janda (Czech feminine: Jandová) is a surname of Czech origin. Notable people with the surname include:
 Anton Janda (1904–1986), Austrian footballer
 Antonín Janda (1892–1960), Czech footballer
 Elisabeth Janda (unknown–1780), Bohemian musician
 Eliška Jandová (born 1974), Czech rower
 František Janda (1886–1956), Czech architect and urban planner
 František Janda (wrestler) (1910–1986), Czech wrestler
 František Janda-Suk (1878–1955), Czech athlete
 Jakub Janda (born 1978), Czech ski jumper
 Jaroslav Janda (born 1942), Czech alpine skier
 Kim Janda (born 1957), American chemist
 Krystyna Janda (born 1952), Polish actress
 Ludmila Jandová (1938–2008), Czech painter and printmaker
 Ludwig Janda (1919–1981), German footballer
 Marta Jandová (born 1974), Czech musician and actress
 Pavel Janda (born 1976), Czech canoer
 Petr Janda (born 1987), Czech footballer
 Petr Janda (architect) (born 1975), Czech architect
 Tomáš Janda (born 1973), Czech footballer
 Vladimír Janda, Czech physician
 Zora Jandová (born 1958), Czech actress and radio presenter
 Zuzana Jandová (born 1987), Czech beauty pageant contestant

See also
 
 

Czech-language surnames